Qerkh Bolagh or Qarakh Bolagh or Qarkh Bolagh, also rendered as Gharakh Bolagh, may refer to various places in Iran:

Qarakh Bolagh, Kowsar, Ardabil Province
Qerkh Bolagh, Meshgin Shahr, Ardabil Province
Qarkh Bolagh, Charuymaq, East Azerbaijan Province
Qerkh Bolagh, Sarab, East Azerbaijan Province
Qerkh Bolagh, Hamadan
Qerkh Bolagh, Qazvin
Qerkh Bolagh, West Azerbaijan